Persatuan Sepakbola Indonesia Tangerang ( 'Indonesian Football Association of Tangerang'), commonly known as Persita is an Indonesian professional football club based in Tangerang. They currently compete in the Liga 1. Their nicknames are Pendekar Cisadane (Cisadane Knight) and Ayam Wareng (The Fierce Rooster). Persita Tangerang finished as a runner-up of the 2019 Liga 2 season.

History 
Persita was first formed in the city of Tangerang on 19 April 1940. It only became an official club after being recognized by the PSSI on 9 September 1953 as their member. In the Liga Indonesia Premier Division era, they were relegated in the 1998–99 Liga Indonesia Premier Division season but got promoted in the next season and clinched the 2000 First Division title. They became runner-up in the 2002 Liga Indonesia Premier Division, with Benny Dollo as coach. Despite losing in the 2011–12 Liga Indonesia Premier Division final to Barito Putera, they were promoted to the Indonesia Super League. After a poor performance in the 2014 Indonesia Super League season, they were relegated to the Liga Indonesia Premier Division.

Stadium 
The club used to play their home matches in Benteng Stadium. In 2014, the government of Tangerang Regency started to build a stadium so called Benteng Taruna Stadium. After the construction was completed in 2018, Persita has been playing their home matches in this stadium.

Supporters 
They have around 10,000 fanatic supporters. Some of the famous supporter groups are LBV (Laskar Benteng Viola), La Viola, and North Legion 1953 (Ultras Persita).

Players

Current squad

Coaching staff

Honours

Domestic competitions
 Liga Indonesia Premier Division  
 Runners-up (2): 2002, 2011–12 
 Third-place: 2003
 Liga Indonesia First Division / Liga 2 
 Winners: 2000
 Runners-up: 2019
 Perserikatan First Division
 Winners: 1988

AFF (Southeast Asia competitions)
ASEAN Club Championship
2003 – Quarter-finals

Season-by-season records

Past seasons 

Key
 Tms. = Number of teams
 Pos. = Position in league

Performance in AFC competitions

References

External links 
  
 Persita Tangerang at Liga Indonesia
 

 
Sport in Banten
Football clubs in Indonesia
Football clubs in Banten
Association football clubs established in 1953
1953 establishments in Indonesia